is a Japanese former wrestler who competed in the 1964 Summer Olympics, in the 1968 Summer Olympics, and in the 1972 Summer Olympics.

References

External links
 

1942 births
Living people
Olympic wrestlers of Japan
Wrestlers at the 1964 Summer Olympics
Wrestlers at the 1968 Summer Olympics
Wrestlers at the 1972 Summer Olympics
Japanese male sport wrestlers
Asian Games medalists in wrestling
Wrestlers at the 1966 Asian Games
Wrestlers at the 1970 Asian Games
Asian Games gold medalists for Japan
Medalists at the 1966 Asian Games
Medalists at the 1970 Asian Games
20th-century Japanese people
21st-century Japanese people
World Wrestling Championships medalists